Pavlovsky Posad is a town and the administrative center of Pavlovo-Posadsky District in Moscow Oblast, Russia, located  from Moscow, at the confluence of the Klyazma and Vokhna Rivers. Population:

History

The town of Pavlovsky Posad was founded in 1844 by merging several villages (Pavlovo, Dubrovo, Zakharovo, and Melenki). From its very foundation, the land on which the town stands belonged to the Trinity Lavra of St. Sergius monastery of the Russian Orthodox Church. Later, from the mid-17th century, the land came into state ownership. Due to these peculiarities, Pavlovsky Posad never knew serfdom.

Administrative and municipal status
Within the framework of administrative divisions, Pavlovsky Posad serves as the administrative center of Pavlovo-Posadsky District. As an administrative division, it is incorporated within Pavlovo-Posadsky District as the Town of Pavlovsky Posad. As a municipal division, the Town of Pavlovsky Posad is incorporated within Pavlovo-Posadsky Municipal District as Pavlovsky Posad Urban Settlement.

Economy
From the very beginning Pavlovsky Posad has had the textile industry as its main business. This industry is still the most prominent in modern town. During the 1990s, most textile factories were transformed into public corporations and went through bankruptcy. The public float index for these factories is currently extremely low: about 90-95% of each factory's shares are owned by one person.

The town has also always been famous for its Pavlovo Posad shawl factories. One of these factories, Pavlovo-Posadkaya Manufaktura, is still producing traditional shawls and kerchiefs in the Russian style. Some other factories survived by concentrating on fire-equipment (such as fire hoses); whereas others yet are producing vestments for Orthodox priests.

Transportation
The Moscow–Vladimir railway goes through the town.

Religion
Pokrovsko-Vasilyevsky Monastery was established near the cemetery in the beginning of the 20th century. In the monastery there's a cathedral that actually incorporates two independent churches: the upper church of Pokrov and the lower of St. Basil the Confessor, who was Vasily Gryaznov's saint patron. For his missionary work among the old believers, Vasily Gryaznov was granted sainthood in 1999. A cathedral also has a belltower. Both the cathedral and the belltower are built in the so-called pseudo-Russian style. There's also a little church of St. Andrey Rublev at the monastery gates.

There are also three more Orthodox churches and one Old Believers' Orthodox church.

Attractions
Local attractions include several 19th-century factory buildings, a local museum, a museum of Russian shawls and kerchiefs, and an exhibition center. Some old tombstones could be found on local Old Believer's cemeteries. There are also many old buildings in the streets of the town center.

Notable people
Valery Bykovsky, cosmonaut
Oleg Chukhontsev, poet
Natalya Petrusyova, speed skater
Vyacheslav Tikhonov, actor
Vasily of Pavlovsky Posad, Russian Orthodox saint

References

Notes

Sources

External links
 Official website of Pavlovsky Posad
 Virtual catalog of Pavlovsky Posad buildings
 Pokrovsko-Vasilyevsky Monastery

Cities and towns in Moscow Oblast